The Archives of Family Medicine was an official publication of the American Medical Association from 1992 through 2000. No longer available from the A.M.A. archives, it remains accessible through CLOCKSS

References

Family medicine journals